"Uhh Ahh" is the title of a number-one R&B single by group Boyz II Men. The song was written by Michael Bivins, Nathan Morris and Wanya Morris.

The song was released as the third single from the group's debut album, Cooleyhighharmony, in 1991 in the United States.

"Uhh Ahh" was another success for the group, peaking at #16 on the Billboard Hot 100 on March 7, 1992, although it was their first single to miss the Top 10. However, the song was a big success on the Billboard Hot R&B/Hip-Hop Singles & Tracks peaking at #1, becoming the group's second #1 single on the chart. The song also peaked at #19 on the Hot 100 Airplay and #14 on the Hot 100 Singles Sales on the same week it peaked at #16 on the Hot 100.

The beginning of the song was sampled in Beyoncé's single "Countdown".

Track listings

US Single
A1 Uhh Ahh (Remix Version)
A2 Uhh Ahh (Sequel Version W/French Girl)
A3 It's So Hard To Say Goodbye To Yesterday (Dedication Version)
B1 Acappella (Sequel Version W/French Girl)
B2 Acappella (Remix Version)

US 12", Promo
A1 Uhh Ahh (Radio Edit) (Sequel Version)
A2 Uhh Ahh (LP Version)
A3 Uhh Ahh (Sequel Version W/French Girl)
A4 Uhh Ahh (Remix Version)
B1 Uhh Ahh (Pop Version)
B2 Uhh Ahh (Acappella) (Sequel Version)
B3 Uhh Ahh (Acappella) (Sequel Version W/French Girl)

Germany Vinyl, 7"
A Uhh Ahh (LP Version) 3:50
B Uhh Ahh (Instrumental) 3:33

Germany Maxi-CD
 Uhh Ahh (Remix, Radio Edit) (Sequel Version) 4:13
 Uhh Ahh (Remix) 4:50
 Uhh Ahh (Remix, Pop Version) 4:06
 Uhh Ahh (Remix, Sequel Version With French Girl) 4:50

Chart performance

Weekly charts

Year-end charts

See also
List of number-one R&B singles of 1992 (U.S.)

References

1991 singles
Boyz II Men songs
Songs written by Michael Bivins
Motown singles
Songs written by Nathan Morris
1991 songs
Songs written by Wanya Morris